The 2008 Stanford Super Series was a cricket tournament sponsored by Texan billionaire Allen Stanford. The tournament was played between 25 October – 1 November consisting of 5 warm-up matches and a US$20 million for the grand finale. This final match was played between the Stanford Superstars and England. Before it began, the tournament was threatened with cancellation due to a row between Digicel, the West Indies Cricket Board's (WICB) main sponsor, and Stanford. Digicel argued that it should get sponsorship rights because it is WICB's sponsorship rights holder and that the tournament was officially sanctioned by the WICB.

All 2008 Super Series matches took place at the Stanford Cricket Ground in Antigua, and started at 5:30 pm local time (9:30 pm in the United Kingdom). All games were aired on Sky Sports in the UK.

Qualification
The Stanford Superstars was a squad selected from the best players in the Stanford 20/20 competition. England competed in the first year of a five-year contract to be involved in the tournament. Trinidad and Tobago qualified as the winners of the Stanford 20/20 whilst Middlesex Crusaders qualified as winners of the Twenty20 Cup in England and Wales.

Summary
The tournament was seen to have been commenced successfully, though pitch conditions meant that its opening matches were low-scoring. Criticism was also levelled at the floodlights in the Antigua pitch, which were low enough to obstruct the vision of fielding players, with Middlesex captain Shaun Udal stating "I have not known a ground where the visibility is as bad". The behaviour of organiser Allen Stanford was also questioned, particularly after he offended a number of England players by acting flirtatiously with their wives during a match, actions for which he later apologised The England team was later hit by a stomach bug, leading Kevin Pietersen to declare that he was looking forward to the tournament's completion. Before the tournament ended, the England and Wales Cricket Board (ECB) announced that they would be reviewing the five-year contract that they had signed with Stanford, bringing into question their participation in future tournaments

However, the Trinidad and Tobago v England game was described as 'thrilling'. The tournament received a large amount of media coverage whilst it was extremely popular with fans in the West Indies. Commentators were generally positive about the success of the tournament within its host venue, with Jonathan Agnew claiming that it was organised significantly better than the previous World Cup, also held in the West Indies.

Matches

Exhibition Matches

Trans-Atlantic Twenty20 Champions Cup

$20 million match

Squads

2008 Stanford SuperStars
On 14 August 2008, the All-Stars selection panel, which was led by cricketing legend Sir Viv Richards, and which included fellow West Indies cricketing luminaries as Sir Everton Weekes, Curtly Ambrose, Lance Gibbs, Richie Richardson, Andy Roberts and Courtney Walsh, announced 17 players who would play under the Stanford SuperStars colours in the Super Series.

 Chris Gayle (c)
 Daren Powell
 Jerome Taylor
 Sylvester Joseph (Vice-captain)
 Chad Hampson
 Dave Mohammed
 Kieron Pollard
 Rayad Emrit
 Ramnaresh Sarwan
 Shivnarine Chanderpaul
 Lennox Cush
 Andre Fletcher
 Sulieman Benn
 Lionel Baker
 Lindon James

Support Staff:
 Coach, Head: Eldine Baptiste
 Coach, Asst: Roger Harper
 Coach, Fielding: Julien Fountain
 Coach, Manager: Cardigan Connor
 Analyst: Robin Singh
 Trainer: Hector Martinez
 Physiotherapist: Kim Jackson
 Physiotherapist Julio Gonsalves
 Physical Therapist: Virgil Browne

(Dwayne Bravo  (injury), and Xavier Marshall  (failed drug test) were named to the initial team under the initial selection procedures, but withdrew before the Series was played. Darren Sammy  and Travis Dowlin  were named to replace them in the squad.)

2008 English squad
On 9 September 2008, three weeks after the Superstars squad was named, the England Cricket Board announced their 15-man squad for the 2008 Super Series.

Kevin Pietersen, Hampshire, (captain)
James Anderson, Lancashire
Ian Bell, Warwickshire
Ravi Bopara, Essex
Stuart Broad, Nottinghamshire
Paul Collingwood, Durham
Alastair Cook, Essex
Andrew Flintoff, Lancashire
Stephen Harmison, Durham
Samit Patel, Nottinghamshire
Matt Prior, Sussex
Owais Shah, Middlesex
Graeme Swann, Nottinghamshire
Ryan Sidebottom, Nottinghamshire
Luke Wright, Sussex

2008 Trinidad and Tobago squad

Rishi Bachan
Samuel Badree  
Darren Bravo 
Kevon Cooper
Daron Cruickshank
Daren Ganga (captain)
Sherwin Ganga
Justin Guillen
Amit Jaggernauth
Richard Kelly
William Perkins
Denesh Ramdin
Ravi Rampaul
Lendl Simmons
Navin Stewart

2008 Middlesex squad
 
Neil Carter
Neil Dexter
Steven Finn
Billy Godleman
Tyron Henderson
Ed Joyce
Murali Kartik
Dawid Malan
Eoin Morgan
Tim Murtagh
David Nash  
Alan Richardson
Ben Scott  
Andrew Strauss
Shaun Udal (captain)

Commercial dispute
Digicel, who sponsors the West Indies Cricket Board, filed suit to halt the Stanford Super Series. They claimed that due to their deal with the West Indies Cricket Board, that they were due certain advertising and broadcasting rights that weren't being granted to them. The response from the West Indies Board, and from the representatives of the Super Series was that the Stanford Superstars were an unofficial team, and thus the Digicel agreement did not come into play. Digicel won the suit, in front of the High Court in London, England. However, they later reached a deal with Stanford Super Series officials, that allowed the tournament to continue for at least three years.

External links
 Stanford2020.com

References

Stanford Super Series, 2008
Cricket in Antigua and Barbuda
2008 in English cricket
Stanford Financial Group
2008 in Caribbean sport
2008–09 West Indian cricket season